Angélique is a Canadian play by Lorena Gale inspired by the executed slave Marie-Joseph Angelique. It premiered in 1998 with Alberta Theatre Projects in Calgary, Alberta. Angélique's off-broadway premiere in 1999 garnered eight Audelco Award nominations.

Development 
A work-in-progress version of Angélique was presented on January 29, 1995 as a staged reading at Women in View Festival in Vancouver. It was directed by Brenda Leadlay and featured the playwright as Angélique. The 1995 text won the duMaurier National Playwriting Competition.

The play is a fictionalized accounted of Marie-Joseph Angélique, a slave who was executed in 1734 in Montreal, then part of New France, for arson.

Plot summary 
The play begins as a young female slave arrives in Montreal from Madiere, Portugal. She is purchased by François Poulin de Franchville for his wife, Thérèse de Couagne, who attests she does not want a slave. Thérèse and François name her Marie-Josèphe Angélique after their dead child. François forces Angélique to have sex with him. At the encouragement of Ignace, Angélique is paired with Caesar, another slave, for breeding. She gives birth to several children, though it is unclear if they are Caesar's or François'. Meanwhile, Angélique begins a romantic relationship with Claude, a white indentured servant.

François dies and Thérèse makes plans to sell Angèlique. Angélique, discovering she is about to be sold, plans to run away to America with Claude. While the two are leaving, a fire breaks out. It is never made clear who set it. On their journey to America, Claude abandons Angèlique, who is later apprehended on suspicion of starting the fire. She is tortured into confessing to starting the fire and is subsequently executed.

Characters 

 Marie-Josèphe Angélique
 François Poulin de Franchville, a wealthy iron works owner
 Thérèse de Couagne, wife to François
 Claude Thibault, an indentured servant
 Ignace Gamelin, business partner of François
 César, Ignace's slave
 Manon, an Aboriginal slave
 Reporter
 Margeurite
 Hypolite
 Marie Louise
 Marie Josephe
 Jean Josephe
 François de Beray

Production history 
Angélique premiered in 1998 at the playRites festival at Alberta Theatre Projects in Calgary.

In 1999, the play had its American premiere at the Detroit Repertory Theatre in Detroit, Michigan. That same year, it was produced in New York, off-Broadway at the Manhattan Class Company Theatre. In New York, it was nominated for eight Audelco Awards. This production was directed by Derek Anson Jones and starred Lisa Gay Hamilton, who understudied the role until Patrice Johnson, the show's original Angèlique, departed mere days before the show.

Angélique was first published in February 2000 by Playwrights Canada Press.

In 2017, Tableau D'Hôte Theatre and Black Theatre Workshop co-produced Angélique at The Studio at the Segal Centre for the Performing Arts in Montreal. The performance, the play's Quebec premiere, was staged to celebrate Montreal’s 375th anniversary. Jenny Brizard played Angélique under the direction of Mike Payette. Two years later, this production toured Ontario including at Factory Theatre and the National Arts Centre.

Awards and nominations

Analysis 
In contrast to Lorris Elliott's and Paul Fehmiu Brown's fictionalizations of Marie-Josèphe Angélique, Gale avoids presenting her as a martyr and presents her, instead, as a seditious rebel.

Angélique blurs the line between history and the present through its use of both modern dress and period clothing as well as through lines that would be anachronistic to the original setting.

References 

Quebec plays
Off-Broadway plays
1998 plays
Plays set in Montreal
English-language plays
Biographical plays about criminals
Plays set in the 18th century
Plays about slavery
Plays about race and ethnicity